Abu Samra is a settlement in Qatar, located in the municipality of Al Rayyan (90 km away from Doha). It used to be part of the Jariyan al Batnah municipality before the municipality was incorporated into Al Rayyan.

Notable features of the area are a border post separating the southern part of the municipality from Saudi Arabia, and a well. It was previously Qatar's only land border crossing to Saudi Arabia, until its closure in June 2017 over the Qatar diplomatic crisis.
The border was opened again when the blockade ended in 2021.

Etymology
The settlement derived its name from a local Samr tree. Because the area contained one of the few Samr trees in the entire region, it was named Abu Samra, meaning 'father of the Samr tree'. The tree has local significance as it is used as fodder for camels.

Geography
It is located in Zone 96, a largely undeveloped zone, consisting mainly of desert plains. Of the zone's 801.7 square km area, only 43 square km of land is under use. Commercial and industrial establishments occupy 2% of its land, government offices occupy 4%, farmland takes up 11% and the remainder of developed land is categorized as "other", which includes under-construction developments.

Qatar's capital, Doha, is located at a distance of 97 km to the north-east. Other distances include Sawda Natheel – 47.2 km away, Umm Salal Ali – 124 km away, Al Khor – 154 km away, Madinat ash Shamal – 204 km away, Al Wakrah – 112 km away, and Dukhan – 127 km away.

According to the Qatar Meteorology Department, the lowest temperature in Qatar's recorded history is 1.5 degrees celsius in Abu Samra in February 2017.

Infrastructure

In 2015, the government announced the upcoming construction of an extensive tourist complex in Abu Samra. It was intended to cater towards Saudi tourists, who would commonly enter Qatar through the Abu Samra border crossing on the weekends.

Aside from the border crossing leading into Saudi Arabia, the Ministry of Interior has an Immigrations Department office and Customs Department office in the settlement. Saudi Arabia's Salwa border crossing is more than 8 km from the Abu Samra border crossing. On 5 June 2017, when a quartet composed of Saudi Arabia, the United Arab Emirates, Bahrain and Egypt severed ties with Qatar, the border crossing was shut down. Prior to its closure, it was the main route into Qatar of building supplies for 2022 World Cup projects as well as fresh produce.

A military base of the Qatar Armed Forces and a helipad are found here.

Industry

The Qatari government established a large sheep farm here in the early 1980s in a bid to improve food self sufficiency. In 1982, the farm was producing 13,000 sheep annually, of which 4,000 were reserved exclusively for breeding.

A major desalination plant in Abu Samra was announced in 2010. At a cost of QAR 27 million, the plant was stated to have a potable water production capacity of 2,000 cubic meters per day, and had a projected completion date in 2011.

References

Populated places in Al Rayyan
Qatar–Saudi Arabia border